Alessandro Vogliacco (born 14 September 1998) is an Italian professional footballer who plays as a centre-back for  club Genoa.

Club career

Juventus
He began to represent the Under-19 squad of Juventus in the 2015–16 season.

Loan to Padova
On 17 August 2018, he joined Serie B club Padova on a season-long loan.

He made his Serie B debut for Padova on 24 November 2018 in a game against Carpi, as a 69th-minute substitute for Luca Ravanelli. That was the only league game he played for Padova.

Loan to Pordenone
On 21 January 2019, he was loaned to Serie C club Pordenone.

Pordenone
On 24 July 2019, he moved to Pordenone (which was promoted to Serie B) on a permanent basis, signing a 3-year contract.

Genoa

Loan to Benevento
On 13 August 2021, he signed with Genoa and was immediately loaned to Benevento.

International career
He was first called up to represent his country in June 2013, for Italy national under-15 football team friendlies. He represented Italy in every subsequent age bracket up to Under-20 team.

On 13 October 2020 he made his debut with the Italy U21 playing as a starter in a qualifying match won 2–0 against Republic of Ireland in Pisa.

Personal life
Vogliacco has a daughter, Violante, born in 2021, with his partner Virginia Mihajlović, daughter of Siniša Mihajlović.

References

External links
 

1998 births
Sportspeople from the Metropolitan City of Bari
Footballers from Apulia
Living people
Italian footballers
Italy youth international footballers
Association football defenders
Calcio Padova players
Pordenone Calcio players
Benevento Calcio players
Genoa C.F.C. players
Serie B players
Serie C players